Pluto Shervington, also known as Pluto (born Leighton Shervington; 13 August 1950 in Kingston, Jamaica), is a reggae musician, singer, engineer and producer.

Career
Shervington began his career in the early 1970s as a member of the showband Tomorrow's Children. Inspired by the success of Ernie Smith's "Duppy or a Gunman" and Tinga Stewart's "Play de Music", both delivered in heavy patois, he recorded in a similar style "Ram Goat Liver", inspiring Lee "Scratch" Perry to produce a popular version with Jimmy Riley. The follow-up single, "Dat" – about a Rastafarian trying to buy pork (without naming it aloud), contrary to his faith, so that he can afford marijuana – achieved considerable chart success internationally in 1976, reaching the number 6 spot in the UK Singles Chart. Trojan Records capitalized on this success by reissuing his first single, which peaked just outside the top 40 in the UK.

Shervington also scored as a producer, overseeing the creation of the 1975 song "Hooray Festival" performed by Roman Stewart, and "Midnight Rider" by Paul Davidson, which peaked at number 10 in the UK Singles Chart in December 1975.

Shervington moved to Miami, Florida, in the early 1980s. He continued to record, and reached the UK top 20 again when "Your Honour" originally recorded in 1975 but never previously released, was re-issued in early 1982 together with a new recording "No Honour Among Tiefs". In 1997, as a guest of honour on Ernie Smith’s celebration of 30 years in the business, Shervington performed alongside Ken Lazarus and the surviving members of the Now Generation band at the Pegasus Hotel in Jamaica. Again, in 2001, alongside Ernie Smith, Shervington performed together with the late musical veteran Lloyd Charmers at the Heineken Startime events for an Independence Showcase, which also included performances from The Abyssinians and Eric Donaldson.

Shervington often performs live in Miami, and periodically returns to his homeland for performances.  he plays solo at Bahama Breeze in Kendall, Florida, and every other Sunday at Black Point Marina in Cutler Bay with a five piece band. Pluto appeared at the St. Kitts Music Festival on Friday 22 June 2007, sharing the bill with Steel Pulse and Sean Paul, among others.

In addition to his work as a singer, Shervington gained a reputation as a talented bass guitarist, and as a recording engineer, notably engineering Little Roy's 1974 album, Tafari Earth Uprising. As of 2018 Shervington was performing solo multiple times a week at the Bahama Breeze restaurant in Miami when not on tour.

Discography

Albums
 Ramgoat (1974)
 Greatest Reggae Hits (1974)
 Pluto (1975)
 Pluto (1976)
 Play Mas''' (1976)
 Ire Mas Rockers Carnival (1981)
 Again (1982)
 Reggae Fever (1982)
 Rhythm Of The City (1990)Second Wind (2008)

SinglesDat (1976) – UK Number 6Ram Goat Liver (1976) – UK Number 43Your Honour'' (1982) – UK Number 19

See also
List of reggae musicians

References

External links
Discography and photograph

1950 births
Living people
Musicians from Kingston, Jamaica
Jamaican male singers
Jamaican reggae singers
Jamaican songwriters
Jamaican record producers
Trojan Records artists